M'saken ( Msākan; also spelled Masakin, Msaken) is a town in north-eastern Tunisia, close to Sousse.

Etymology 
The origin of the word comes from "Msaken" masken (plural masken) meaning "habitat", "house" or "dwelling". 
This refers to "Houses of honorable people" (Masken el achraf)

Administration 

The town is the administrative center of a "delegation" (district) of the same name, which at the 2014 Census had a population of 97,225.

Municipality 

M'saken municipality was found in 19/02/1921.

The actual municipal council was elected in the Local elections of Tunisia in May 9th, 2018.
Its composition by party is as follows:

Villages and towns of Delegation

The following villages and Towns are part of M'saken delegation

Notable people 
Habib Chatti, Politician, Diplomat
Karim Krifa, Politician.
Zied Ladhari, Politician.
Zoubeir Baya, Football player
Saïf Ghezal, Football player.
 Ridha Layouni: President of Association of National Olympic Academies of Africa (AANOA) and Former Tunisian National Olympic Committee.
 Brahim Babaï, Producer.
 Jalila Hafsia, Journalist, Writer.
 Chedly Anouar, Musician.
 Mohamed Bellalouna, Politician.

Traditional doors 
Traditional houses of M'saken have typical traditional doors which are also found in the neighbour villages and towns (Zaouiet Sousse, Ouerdanine, Beni Kalthoum, :fr:Borjine, Moureddine ...).
The door can be double or with single leaf, and has always a small leaf inside called khoukha (literally =pear).

.
.
.

History 

According to local tradition, M'saken was founded by a group of descendants of Husayn Ibn Ali, grandson of the prophet Muhammad. They had come to North Africa escaping from the Abbasid rulers of Baghdad, who had been engaged in a cruel fight against Sharifians (descendants of Husayn and his brother Hassan) the sons of Ali.

They founded a Sharifian Emirate in near present-day Tiaret in west-central Algeria. After three generations, following the fall of this Emirate, some of their descendants lived in eastern Morocco near Oujda for some time, before moving to Kairouan in Tunisia. After some decades, they founded the town of M'saken at the time of the Hafsid dynasty which was based in Tunis.

Their town was originally called 'Kousour al Ashraf' (which means "Sharif's houses"), then 'Masakin al Ashraf' (which has the same meaning), and finally Masakin - or 'Msaken' as it is pronounced and spelled in North Africa. The town centre was built around the Jamma al Awsat (which means the central mosque) and was composed of five ksars (great houses).

Ksours of Msaken
The population which founded Msaken is composed of 5 groups (Ksour) having each a common paternal ancestor:
 Ksar El Nejejra
 Ksar El Menaama
 Ksar El Jabliyine
 Ksar El Qebliyine
 Ksar El Jedidiyine

Historic monuments 
The Awsat Mosque of M'saken is among the oldest known monuments of M'saken city.  It was founded around the year 1360.

Soufism 
M'saken is known to be a religious city.  It included the Madrasa of Sidi Ali ben Khalifa and over the centuries has been home to a number of Sufi figures:

 Sheikh Mohamed Gazzah
 Sheikh Ladharai
 Sidi Omar Shatti
 Sidi Ali Ben Khalifa

Statistics
 Population:	125,694 inhabitants (Whole delegation 2018 census)
 Altitude:	112 m
 Number of hospitals: (private and public) 	3

Traditional dresses 
Traditional dresses of M'saken as typical of North Africa and more specifically of the Tunisian Sahel region.

The Melya, traditional dress of women in North Africa, was used in M'saken but today it is no longer used.

In Tunisia, each village or region uses a specific color for its women Houli (Melya).
According to old people it had the color gold for M'saken women.

Dialect 
M'saken people speak the Msakni dialect, which is branch of the Sahli dialect, specific to the Sahel, Tunisia region, and which is a Pre-Hilalian_Arabic_dialect
and a citadin pre hilalian language 
The most characteristic word being the pronoun of the first person singular pronounced 'eni' in the Sahel instead of 'ena': In M'saken it is said 'yeni' by replacing the vowel 'e' by 'y'
M'saken dialect is also recognisable by the strong vowel 'i' at the end of many words (nouns and verbs ) which are pronounced at the end with a soft 'i' in the rest of the Sahel and as 'e' or 'a' in the rest of Tunisia and North Africa.
 Examples:
 He went: Mshi (M'saken), Mshei (rest of Sahel), Mshe (Tunis), Msha (Central and west Algeria)
 He ate : Kli (M'saken), Klei (rest ofSahel), Kle(Tunis), Kla (Central and west Algeria)
 Water: Mi (M'saken), Mei (rest of Sahel), Me(Tunis), Ma (Central and West Algeria)
 Here: Hni (M'saken), Hnei(Rest of Sahel), Hne or Houni(Tunis), Hna (Central and West Algeria)

Migrations 
M'saken has a large population living in foreign countries, mainly in France and more particularly in the Côte d'Azur region, in Nice and neighbouring areas. According to some sources, 40% of the population of M'saken lives outside Tunisia. The town's population increases very significantly in July and August every year following the return of migrants to their hometown for the holidays.

Climate 
Köppen-Geiger climate classification system classifies M'saken climate as hot semi-arid (BSh) bordering with hot-summer Mediterranean (Csa).

It is considered to be a local steppe climate.

There is little rainfall throughout the year.

The average annual temperature is 18.3 °C in M'Saken.

In a year, the average rainfall is 347 mm.

Sports 
M'saken has many sport teams:
 Football / Handball : Croissant Sportif de M'saken founded in 1945.
 Rugby : Avenir sportif de M'saken founded in 1991.

See also
List of cities in Tunisia

References

population
Twin cities
weather
Statistics
Msaken Tree

External links 
Commune de M'saken
M'saken Climate
Msakenian language (fr)
 

Populated places in Tunisia
Communes of Tunisia